Berkeley most often refers to:

Berkeley, California, a city in the United States
University of California, Berkeley, a public university in Berkeley, California
George Berkeley (1685–1753), Anglo-Irish philosopher

Berkeley may also refer to:

Places

Australia
 Berkeley, New South Wales, a suburb of Wollongong

Canada
 Berkeley, Ontario, a community in Grey County

United Kingdom
 Berkeley (hundred), an administrative division from late Saxon period to the 19th century
 Berkeley, Gloucestershire, a town in England

United States
 Berkeley, California, a city in the San Francisco Bay Area, the largest city named Berkeley
 Berkeley, Denver, a neighborhood in Denver, Colorado
 Berkeley, Illinois, a suburb of Chicago
 Berkeley, Missouri, a northwestern suburb of St. Louis
 Berkeley Township, Ocean County, New Jersey
 Berkeley, Rhode Island
 Berkeley, Virginia (disambiguation)
 Berkeley, West Virginia
 Berkeley County (disambiguation)

People
 Berkeley (given name), a given name (and list of people with that name)
 Berkeley (surname), a surname (and list of people with that name)
 Berkeley family, an aristocratic English family

Brands and enterprises
 Berkeley (1913), a car manufacturer in the U.K.
 Berkeley Cars, a British car manufacturer
 Berkeley Cinemas, a cinema chain in Auckland, New Zealand
 Berkeley Group Holdings, a British housebuilding company
 Berkeley Systems, a San Francisco Bay Area software company

Hotels
 Berkeley Hotel, an historic former hotel in Montreal, Canada, now part of the Maison Alcan complex
 The Berkeley, Wilton Place, Knightsbridge, London, England
 The Berkeley, Scunthorpe, pub and hotel in Scunthorpe, England

Schools
 University of California, Berkeley, a public research university in Berkeley, California, U.S
 Berkeley Adult School, in Berkeley, California, U.S.
 Berkeley City College, a community college in Berkeley, California, U.S.
 Berkeley College (Yale University), a residential college at Yale University, U.S.
 Berkeley College, in New York and New Jersey, U.S.
 Berklee College of Music, in Boston, Massachusetts, U.S.
 Berkeley County Schools, the operating school district within Berkeley County, West Virginia, U.S.
 Berkeley High School (disambiguation)

Ships
 Berkeley (ferryboat), a ferryboat that operated on San Francisco Bay for sixty years
 HMS Berkeley Castle, two British naval ships

Software
 Berkeley DB, an embedded database system by Sleepycat Software
 Berkeley Fast File System,  Unix file system
 Berkeley Software Distribution, a Unix operating system

Other uses 
 Berkeley (film), a 2005 drama directed by Bobby Roth
 Berkeley Hundred or Berkeley Plantation, Charles City, Virginia, U.S.
 Berkeley Hunt, a foxhound pack in Gloucestershire and South Gloucestershire counties, England
 Berkeley National Laboratory, a United States national laboratory near Berkeley, California, U.S.
 Berkeley Test, saliva nitric test for assessing cardioprotection
 Berkeley Racing Canoe Center, a non-profit organization promoting dragon boat sport in the Berkeley Marina, Berkeley, CA

See also
 Barkley (disambiguation)
 Berkley (disambiguation)
 Barclay (disambiguation)
 Berkeley Building
 Berkeley Group (disambiguation)
 Berkeley House (disambiguation)
 Berkeley Square (disambiguation)
 Berkeley station (disambiguation), stations of the name
 Berkelium, a transuranic element (symbol Bk) named after the University of California, Berkeley